Flanders District of Creativity or Flanders DC  is a non-profit organization founded by the Flemish government, on 7 May 2004, centered around the design and fashion sector.

Goals
 Research: analysis of the role of creativity in the economic growth of a region, and how companies and organisations can get to more creativity and innovation (Flanders Knowledge center in collaboration with Vlerick Leuven Gent Management School and Antwerp Management School).
 Internationalization of creativity, innovation and entrepreneurship through collaboration with 13 other Districts of Creativity (DC). Besides Flanders, these DCs are Baden-Württemberg (Germany), Catalunya (Spain), Central Denmark (Denmark), Karnataka (India), Lombardy (Italy), Nord-Pas-de-Calais (France), Oklahoma (US), Qingdao (China), Rhône-Alpes (France), Rio de Janeiro (Brasil), Scotland (United Kingdom), Shanghai (China), and Tampere (Finland).

Projects/events
 Creativity World Forum (The DC's meet @ the CWF)
 GPS brainstorming kit (idea generation tool)
 Flanders DC Fellows (50 entrepreneurs, managers testify on creative entrepreneurship in schools)
 De Bedenkers (TV Show in collaboration with Flanders DC)
 SOS Idee (free first-aid service for people with an idea or invention)
 The Future Summit (Event on trends)

See also
 Science and technology in Flanders
 Institute for the promotion of Innovation by Science and Technology
 Flanders Investment and Trade
 Agoria
 SIRRIS, knowledge centre for the technology industry

External links
 Flanders DC (Flanders DC website and creativity portal)
 Creativity World Forum
 De Bedenkers
 The Future Summit

Innovation organizations
Entrepreneurship organizations
Flanders
Government agencies of Belgium
Science and technology in Belgium
Research and development in Belgium